The A.J. Smith House was a historic house on Arkansas Highway 385 in Griffithville, Arkansas.  It was a two-story wood-frame structure, with a T-shaped gable-roofed structure, weatherboard siding, and a foundation of brick piers.  A hip-roofed porch extended across the front of the projecting T section and around the side.  The house was built about 1887, and was one of White County's few surviving 19th-century houses.

The house was listed on the National Register of Historic Places in 1991.  It has been listed as destroyed in the Arkansas Historic Preservation Program database.

See also
National Register of Historic Places listings in White County, Arkansas

References

Houses on the National Register of Historic Places in Arkansas
Houses completed in 1887
Houses in White County, Arkansas
Demolished buildings and structures in Arkansas
National Register of Historic Places in White County, Arkansas
1887 establishments in Arkansas